Pen-y-Pound is a cricket ground in Abergavenny, Wales. It is the home of Abergavenny Cricket Club, who play in the South Wales Cricket League. The ground was first used by the Glamorgan 1st XI in 1981 for limited over matches and in 1983 for County Championship matches. Between 1985 and 1997, the ground hosted a County Championship match annually. However, Glamorgan have only used the ground twice since then.

The ground has hosted 16 first-class matches, including Glamorgan v Bangladesh A in 2005 and 3 List A matches, including Wales Minor Counties v Denmark, a Cheltenham and Gloucester Trophy match, in 2003. 
The ground's location makes it one of the most scenically attractive in the country.

Game Information:
{| class="wikitable"
|-
! Game Type
! No. of Games
|-
| County Championship Matches
| 15
|-
| limited-over county matches
| 2
|-
| Twenty20 matches
| 0
|}

Game Statistics: first-class:
{| class="wikitable"
|-
! Category
! Information
|-
| Highest Team Score
| Worcestershire (514/4dec against Glamorgan) in 1990 and Glamorgan (514/4dec against Gloucestershire) in 1991
|-
| Lowest Team Score
| No team has been bowled out for below 100 on this ground
|-
| Best Batting Performance
| Andrew Symonds (254 Runs for Gloucestershire against Glamorgan) in 1995
|-
| Best Bowling Performance
| Javagal Srinath (9/76 for Gloucestershire against Glamorgan) in 1995
|}

Game Statistics: one-day matches:
{| class="wikitable"
|-
! Category
! Information
|-
| Highest Team Score
| Glamorgan (229/7 in 40 overs against Northamptonshire) in 1982
|-
| Lowest Team Score
| Glamorgan (152 in 39.2 overs against Worcestershire) in 1981
|-
| Best Batting Performance
| Rodney Ontong (100 Runs for Glamorgan against Northamptonshire) in 1982
|-
| Best Bowling Performance
| Jack Birkenshaw (3/17 for Worcestershire against Glamorgan) in 1981
|}

External links
 Cricinfo Website - Ground Page
 Cricket Archive page

Cricket grounds in Wales
Abergavenny
Sport in Monmouthshire
1896 establishments in Wales
Glamorgan County Cricket Club